Jackie Dennis (8 October 1942 – 28 September 2020) was a Scottish singer. He was discovered by the comedians Mike and Bernie Winters in 1958. The brothers brought him to the attention of the show business agent Eve Taylor, and he appeared on the television programme, Six-Five Special, at the age of 15, and in a subsequent film spin-off.

Chart success
The kilt-wearing, spiky-haired pop singer enjoyed seven successful years in the show business and toured the world. "La Dee Dah" was his biggest UK hit, reaching number 4 in the UK Singles Chart in 1958, whilst his cover of Sheb Wooley's "Purple People Eater"  was his second and final UK hit, peaking at number 29.

Dennis appeared on Perry Como's US television show, where he was introduced as 'Britain's Ricky Nelson' performing the song "Linton Addie".

He latterly worked as a nursing home carer, before retiring and living in Pilton, Edinburgh, with wife Irene, to whom he was married for over 30 years. He died in September 2020 at the age of 77.

Discography

Singles
"La Dee Dah" / "You're the Greatest" (1958) (Decca F 10992)
"Miss Valerie" / "My Dream" (1958) (Decca F 11011)
"The Purple People Eater" / "You-oo" (1958) (Decca F 11033)
"More Than Ever" / "Linton Addie" (1958) (Decca F 11060)
"Lucky Ladybug" / "Gingerbread" (1958) (Decca F 11090)
"The Wee Cooper O' Fife" / "Come Along" (1959) (Decca F 11120)
"Summer Snow" / "Night Bird" (1959) (Top Rank JAR 129)

References

External links
 
 Entry at 45cat.com

1942 births
2020 deaths
Musicians from Edinburgh
20th-century Scottish male singers
Scottish pop singers